Tatworth is a village  south of Chard in the South Somerset district of the county of Somerset, England. It is within Tatworth and Forton civil parish, and the electoral ward of the same name.

Tatworth is a large village, consisting of a number of smaller villages including South Chard, Perry Street and Chard Junction which are close together. The hamlet of Forton lies to the north, towards Chard.

History
A white lias limestone Roman tessera measuring  x  x  and regularly cut on two faces was found in the area, and may be connected with the remains of a Roman villa or farmhouse by St Margaret's Lane. Part of this building was excavated in 1967 and pottery and paving found there are displayed in the Chard Museum.

The name of the village comes from the Old English tat and worp meaning 'A cheerful farm'. In 1254, the spelling was Tattewurthe and was a sub-manor of Chard. In 1554 Thatteworh was granted to William Petre as the 'manor and park of Tatworthy' and remained in the family until 1790.

Governance
The parish council has responsibility for local issues, including setting an annual precept (local rate) to cover the council’s operating costs and producing annual accounts for public scrutiny. The parish council evaluates local planning applications and works with the local police, district council officers, and neighbourhood watch groups on matters of crime, security, and traffic. The parish council's role also includes initiating projects for the maintenance and repair of parish facilities, as well as consulting with the district council on the maintenance, repair, and improvement of highways, drainage, footpaths, public transport, and street cleaning. Conservation matters (including trees and listed buildings) and environmental issues are also the responsibility of the council.

The village falls within the non-metropolitan district of South Somerset, which was formed on 1 April 1974 under the Local Government Act 1972, having previously been part of Chard Rural District. The district council is responsible for local planning and building control, local roads, council housing, environmental health, markets and fairs, refuse collection and recycling, cemeteries and crematoria, leisure services, parks, and tourism.

Somerset County Council is responsible for running the most expensive local services such as education, social services, libraries, main roads, public transport, policing and fire services, trading standards, waste disposal and strategic planning.

It is also part of the Yeovil county constituency, represented in the House of Commons.

Amenities
St John's Church, which dates from 1851, is designated by English Heritage as a Grade II listed building.

Tatworth has a primary school, two pubs – Ye Olde Poppe Inn and the Golden Fleece – and the Perry Street Club, a members-only club. It also has a McColl's shop which is also a post office.
Tatworth has a number of local sports clubs. The Perry Street & District Football League was formed in Tatworth in 1903 by Charles Edward Small, the owner of the Perry Street Lace Works. Perry Street Football Club still play in the league today. There is also a cricket club and local skittles league based at Perry Street Club.

Stowell Meadow is a biological Site of Special Scientific Interest.

References

External links

Villages in South Somerset
Civil parishes in Somerset